Kudoa kenti is a  myxosporean parasite of marine fishes, first discovered in Australia from 4 pomacentrid species.

References

Further reading
Griffin, Matt, et al. "Kudoa thunni from blackfin tuna (Thunnus atlanticus) harvested off the island of St. Kitts, West Indies." Journal of Parasitology100.1 (2014): 110-116.
Mansour, Lamjed, et al. "Structural and molecular characterization of Kudoa quraishii n. sp. from the trunk muscle of the Indian mackerel Rastrelliger kanagurta (Perciforme, Scombridae) in Saudi Arabia coasts." Parasitology research 113.4 (2014): 1361-1370.
Miller, T. L., and R. D. Adlard. "Unicapsula species (Myxosporea: Trilosporidae) of Australian marine fishes, including the description of Unicapsula andersenae n. sp. in five teleost families off Queensland, Australia." Parasitology research 112.8 (2013): 2945-2957.

External links

Kudoidae
Animal parasites of fish
Veterinary parasitology
Animals described in 2009